The Moser Stone House is a historic building located in Guttenberg, Iowa, United States.  This two-story limestone structure is a side gable house whose construction dates from before 1858.  It is located along an alley at the rear of the property, and features an enclosed porch that is typical of many early residences in town.  The building was listed on the National Register of Historic Places in 1984.

References

Vernacular architecture in Iowa
Houses in Guttenberg, Iowa
Houses on the National Register of Historic Places in Iowa
National Register of Historic Places in Clayton County, Iowa